Trabuco Cañon National Forest was established as the Trabuco Cañon Forest Reserve by the General Land Office in California on February 25, 1893 with . In 1905 all federal forests were transferred to the U.S. Forest Service. On July 6, 1907 the name was changed to Trabuco Canyon National Forest and lands were added. 

The reserve was the third set aside in California, after San Gabriel and Sierra reserves. It originally covered   in the Santa Ana Mountains. Its purpose was the protection of water presources. It is now the Cleveland National Forest.

References

External links
Forest History Society
Listing of the National Forests of the United States and Their Dates (from Forest History Society website) Text from Davis, Richard C., ed. Encyclopedia of American Forest and Conservation History. New York: Macmillan Publishing Company for the Forest History Society, 1983. Vol. II, pp. 743-788.

Former National Forests of California